This is a list of notable dance-pop artists.

0–9

1 Girl Nation
13 Stories
2 Unlimited
3OH!3

A

Aaliyah
Paula Abdul
Ace of Base
Christina Aguilera
Alcazar
AlunaGeorge
A-L-X
Ambitious Lovers
Anastacia
Annie
Aqua
David Archuleta
Tina Arena
Army of Lovers
Rick Astley
Atomic Kitten
The Attic
Audio Playground
Aurora
Avicii
Axé Bahia

B

B*Witched
Backstreet Boys
Bad Boys Blue
Zoë Badwi
Bananarama
Banghra
Azealia Banks
Bardeux
Basement Jaxx
Bastille
Daniel Bedingfield
The Beloved
Betty Who
The Beu Sisters
Beyoncé
Justin Bieber
The Black Eyed Peas
Black Kids
Blood Orange
Bloodshy & Avant
The Boomtang Boys
La Bouche
David Bowie
Brazilian Girls
Bronski Beat
Chris Brown
Havana Brown
Emma Bunton

C

C+C Music Factory
Can-linn
Mariah Carey
Caribou
Dina Carroll
Aaron Carter
Cascada
Cause and Effect
Charli XCX
Cher
Neneh Cherry
China Doll
Ciara
Classixx
Clean Bandit
Cobra Starship
Kimberly Cole
The Communards
Company B
Ida Corr
The Cover Girls
Taio Cruz
Cut Copy

D

Da Pump
Taylor Dayne
DB Boulevard
Dead Disco
Dead or Alive
Dee Dee
Deee-Lite
Delorean
Kat DeLuna
Destiny's Child
Deuce
Dev
DHT
Celine Dion
Disclosure
DJ BoBo
DJ Encore
Dubstar
Hilary Duff

E

Stacy Earl
East 17
Eiffel 65
Sophie Ellis-Bextor
Empire of the Sun
Jocelyn Enriquez
Gloria Estefan
Everything Everything
Exposé

F

Sky Ferreira
Fifth Harmony
Five
Flo Rida
Foster the People
Samantha Fox
Frankie Goes to Hollywood
Fun Factory

G

Debbie Gibson
Girls Aloud
globe
The Go! Team
Selena Gomez
Wynter Gordon
Gorillaz
Ellie Goulding
Ariana Grande
David Guetta

H

Her Majesty & the Wolves
Paris Hilton
Hurts

I
Innosense

J

La Toya Jackson
Janet Jackson
Michael Jackson
Samantha James
Jewel
Joée
Joy
Jump5
Junior Senior
Juvelen

K

Kesha
Mary Kiani
Natalia Kills
Kim Hyun-jung
King África
Kisses
The KLF
Solange Knowles

L

Lady Gaga
Laila
George Lamond
Jessy Lanza
LCD Soundsystem
Lisa Lisa and Cult Jam
LMFAO
Locomía
Jennifer Lopez
Louie Louie
Luciana

M

M People
Madonna
Maroon 5
Lisa Matassa (as Lysa Lynn)
Matt and Kim
Ava Max
Mel and Kim
Javiera Mena
M.I.A.
Miami Sound Machine
George Michael
MiChi
Mika
Milli Vanilli
Nicki Minaj
Dannii Minogue
Kylie Minogue
Modern Talking
Moloko
Momoiro Clover Z
Alanis Morissette
m.o.v.e
Movetron
Samantha Mumba
James Murphy
Róisín Murphy

N

N-Trance
Nabiha
The Neptunes
New Kids on the Block
Olivia Newton-John
Ne-Yo
Nikkole
NRG
NSYNC

O

OFF
Emily Osment
Donny Osmond

P

Kevin Paige
Paradiso Girls
Sarina Paris
Pebbles
Katy Perry
Paul Pesco
Pet Shop Boys
Pink
Pizzicato Five
Play
Pnau
Gabry Ponte
Prima J
Prince
Private
The Pussycat Dolls

Q
Cara Quici

R

Raze
Richard X
Ricki-Lee
Right Said Fred
Rihanna
Robyn
Rockell
Kelly Rowland

S

S Club 7
Marta Sánchez
Santigold
The Saturdays
Seiko Matsuda
Selena Gomez & the Scene
September
Shakira
Shinee
Shura
Sia
Jessica Simpson
Troye Sivan
Sam Smith
Solid HarmoniE
Tommy Sparks
Britney Spears
Speed
Spice Girls
Stacey Q
Stakka Bo
Alexandra Stan
Lisa Stansfield
Brenda K. Starr
Gwen Stefani
Steps
Stevie B
Stock Aitken Waterman
Sugababes
Linda Sundblad
Swedish House Mafia
Taylor Swift
Sylvan Esso

T

T-ara
T-Spoon
Take That
Tarkan
t.A.T.u.
Tegan and Sara
Therese
Tiësto
Tiffany
Timbaland
Justin Timberlake
The Ting Tings
Katy Tiz
Melissa Tkautz
TLC
Judy Torres
Totally Enormous Extinct Dinosaurs
Jolin Tsai

U
Usher

V

Vassy
Vengaboys
V*Enna
The Very Best
Vitamin C

W

Wallpaper
Jessie Ware
Pete Waterman
Jody Watley
Wham!
Karyn White
Wild Orchid
Will to Power
Vanessa L. Williams
Kimberly Wyatt

X

XLR8
Xuxa

Y

Yazz
Yelle
Yuri

Z
ZOEgirl

References

Bibliography

Dance-pop
Dance-pop